Almendralejo is a town in the Province of Badajoz, Extremadura, Spain. It is situated 45 km south-east of Badajoz, on the main road and rail route between Mérida and Seville. , it has a population of 33,975. It was the site of a battle and massacre in 1936 during the Spanish Civil War.

Historical overview

The beautiful large silver Missorium of Theodosius I, one of the best surviving examples of Late Antique Imperial imagery, was found here indicating that an important late ancient Roman site must be in the vicinity.

The "Albero de ferria" at Almendralejo, constructed in 1747, was one of the earliest examples of a large scale hydropower dam. It was a rubble-masonry structure and had several buttresses to strengthen it. Some of these were roofed over to house a mill and it was the first dam to contain a water wheel actually within its structure.

There was a battle and massacre here in 1936 during the Spanish Civil War.

The future Queen Letizia of Spain married Alonso Guerrero Pérez, a writer and teacher in Almendralejo in 1998. The marriage was dissolved by divorce in 1999.

Geography
It is to the south of the River Guadiana on an extensive plain, with the slightly raised area to the south being known as the Tierra de Barros. The town grew rapidly at the end of the nineteenth century as the roads and railways were developed. It has broad streets and handsome buildings. The economy is centred on agriculture with extensive cultivation of cereals, fruit and grapes. There are many vineyards around the town, with a local red wine being produced, and the area is also known for the production of brandy.

Culture
Notable historical buildings of Almendralejo include the church of the Purification, the Iglesia Parroquial de Nuestra Señora de la Purificación, finished in 1515, in Gothic style. It has a well-proportioned tower and a seventeenth century retablo (devotional painting). The Palacio del Marqués de Monsalud is a seventeenth century building now used as council offices. The building surrounds a central courtyard, and on the ground floor there are arches mounted on pink granite columns, and a pedestal decorated with eighteenth century Seville tiles; on the first floor there is a red ceramic balustrade supported by small granite columns with arches. It was the birthplace of the revolutionary poet José de Espronceda, and houses a museum of Roman antiquities found in the region.

Carolina Coronado (full name: Victoria Carolina Coronado y Romero de Tejada) (12 December 1820 – 15 January 1911) was a Spanish writer, famous for her poetry, considered the equivalent of contemporary Romantic authors like Rosalía de Castro. As one of the most well-known poets writing in mid-19th-century Spain, she also played a diplomatic role (she was married to Horatio Perry, the American Secretary of the U.S. Legation in Madrid.) She both negotiated with the Spanish royal family in private and, through a series of widely published poems, promoted the aims of the Lincoln administration, especially abolition of slavery.

Demographics
The graph below shows the change in population since 1842.

Sport
CF Extremadura represented the town in domestic football competitions. Founded in 1924, they reached their peak in 1996 when they secured promotion for the 1996–97 La Liga season for the first time in their history. After relegation at the end of their inaugural season in La Liga, the club returned to the top division for the 1998–99 season, again failing to stay in the top division. Following several years of financial problems, the club folded eventually in 2010.

In 2007, another football club known as Extremadura UD was founded as a continuation of the financially struggling previous club. As of 2018, Extremadura UD are playing in the Segunda División (the second level of the Spanish football league system). With a capacity of 11,580 seats, Estadio Francisco de la Hera is the home ground of the club.

Gallery

References

External links
 

Municipalities in the Province of Badajoz